James Graham Ramey (February 12, 1917 – July 19, 2015) was an American politician in the state of South Dakota who was a member of the South Dakota House of Representatives from 1955 to 1964. Ramey was an alumnus of Dakota Wesleyan University and was a cattle rancher. He was married to Myrtle Olive Alden from 1939 to her death in 2007. He died in 2015.

References

1917 births
2015 deaths
South Dakota Republicans
Dakota Wesleyan University alumni
People from Haakon County, South Dakota